Kenneth Sheils Reddin (born John Kenneth Sheils Reddin; 1895 – 17 August 1967) know by the pen name Kenneth Sarr, was an Irish author and judge.

Biography

He was born in Dublin to John [J. J.] and Annie Reddin. He attended Belvedere College, Clongowes Wood College, and from 1910 Scoil Éanna, where Thomas McDonagh and Patrick Pearse were formative influences. His first pseudonym was Kenneth Esser (from "Kenneth S. R.") later shortened to Kenneth Sarr. He joined the Irish Volunteers and was interned after the Easter Rising. Literary figures often met at J.J. Reddin's house and Kenneth was associated with the Irish Theatre Company in Hardwicke Street, where his brothers Kerry and Norman acted. He attended University College Dublin and qualified as a solicitor. He was a member of the United Arts Club and sometime President of the Irish PEN Club. He visited James Joyce in Paris several times, first with a gift of Olhausen's black pudding, later at a PEN congress. Joyce, during his father's final illness, telegraphed Reddin's brother Dr Kerry Reddin about his treatment.

Reddin supported the Anglo-Irish Treaty and his father's house in Artane was burned in the Irish Civil War. In 1922 he was appointed a District Court judge based in Mullingar, later moving to the Newbridge and then Dublin districts. In court he wore what Terry De Valera called "his self-designed headdress like a black biretta". As well as writing plays and novels, he collected humorous anecdotes from his judicial work intended for a book to be called Laughter in My Court.  In 1941 he objected to an article in PEN's magazine which he said was "propaganda, attacking the neutrality of Eire, and that all we wanted was to be left alone". In 1948, Erina Brady appointed him President of her short-lived Dublin Dance Theatre Club.

He retired from the bench on 19 March 1965.

His papers are held by the Kenneth Spencer Research Library at the University of Kansas.

References

Sources

Citations

1895 births
1967 deaths
Writers from Dublin (city)
People from Mullingar
20th-century Irish judges
20th-century Irish lawyers
Irish male dramatists and playwrights
20th-century Irish dramatists and playwrights
20th-century Irish novelists
Irish revolutionaries
Alumni of University College Dublin
People educated at Clongowes Wood College
People educated at Belvedere College
Irish republicans interned without trial
People educated at St. Enda's School